Deepak Birua is an Indian politician and member of the Jharkhand Mukti Morcha. Birua is a member of the Jharkhand Legislative Assembly from the Chaibasa constituency in West Singhbhum district in 2009, 2014 and 2019.

References 

People from West Singhbhum district
Jharkhand Mukti Morcha politicians
Members of the Jharkhand Legislative Assembly
Living people
21st-century Indian politicians
Year of birth missing (living people)
Jharkhand MLAs 2009–2014
Jharkhand MLAs 2014–2019
Jharkhand MLAs 2019–2024